Thurnscoe railway station serves Thurnscoe in South Yorkshire, England. Only stopping services call at the station. It was opened as a new station on 16 May 1988. The station was built by British Rail.

Although the line passed through the three settlements of Thurnscoe, neighbouring Goldthorpe and Bolton-on-Dearne, the Swinton & Knottingley Joint railway originally provided only two stations for the area, at Bolton-on-Dearne and at Frickley. Until 1961 the station was called Bolton on Dearne for Goldthorpe and was served by Sheffield-York stopping services. By the late 1980s the low demand for York-bound passengers meant that only a handful of stopping trains used the line. South Yorkshire Passenger Transport Executive, responding to increasing demand for Sheffield-Leeds passengers in the area, and a lack of capacity on the Sheffield-Barnsley-Leeds line, sponsored an hourly service via Bolton and opened new stations at Goldthorpe and Thurnscoe.

Facilities

The two wooden platforms each have a shelter and passenger information notice boards.  It is not staffed and has a single ticket machine on the north-bound platform, meaning passengers are expected to purchase their tickets, then traverse two long ramps and the railway bridge if they wish to travel southbound.  Though there is step-free access from the car park onto the platforms, Northern's station information page states that it is unsuitable for use by disabled passengers. The cycle racks are also somewhat secluded and have low security.

Service
From Monday to Saturday, there is an hourly service to Sheffield southbound and to Leeds via  northbound. On Sunday, there is also an hourly service in each direction, though starting later in the morning.

Northbound services, to Leeds, leave at 47 minutes past the hour, while southbound, to Sheffield, leave at 26 minutes past the hour. Times on Sundays, early mornings and late evenings vary from this, passengers should consult the timetables.

References

External links

Railway stations in Barnsley
Railway stations opened by British Rail
Railway stations in Great Britain opened in 1988
Northern franchise railway stations